Walters is a town in Cotton County, Oklahoma, United States. The population was 2,551 at the 2010 census.  The city, nestled between twin creeks, is the county seat of Cotton County. The city's motto is "Small town; Big heart."

History 
The land that is present-day Oklahoma was first settled by prehistoric American Indians including the Clovis 11500 BCE, Folsom 10600 BCE and Plainview 10000 BCE cultures. Western explorers came to the region in the 16th century, with Spanish explorer Francisco Vásquez de Coronado visiting in 1541. Most of the region during this time was settled by the Wichita and Caddo peoples. Around the 1700s, two tribes from the North, the Comanches and Kiowas, migrated to the Oklahoma and Texas region.

For most of the 18th century, the Oklahoma region was under French control as part of Louisiana. In 1803, the Louisiana Purchase by Thomas Jefferson brought the area under United States control. In 1830, Congress passed the Indian Removal Act, which removed American Indian tribes and relocated them to Indian Territory. The southern part of the territory was originally assigned to the Choctaw and Chickasaw, until the 1867 Medicine Lodge Treaty allotted the southwest portion of the Choctaw and Chickasaw's lands to the Comanche, Kiowa, and Apache.

The City of Walters was organized on August 6, 1901, under the original name of McKnight, Indian Territory. Application for a post office was made, and it was determined that a town in Harmon County had already taken the name of McKnight. This required that the name be changed. The name of Walters was chosen, in honor of W. R. Walters, but the "s" was not included on the post office application, so the post office was named Walter.

The city finally grew large enough to meet the requirements for a government patent, and one was granted in June 1904. On August 12, 1912, an election was held to form a new County (Cotton) from a portion of Comanche County. The election was successful and Cotton County became the last county formed in Oklahoma on August 28, 1912. Shortly thereafter, another election was held to determine whether Walters or Temple would become the county seat; on December 2, 1912, Walters won by 282 votes, officially becoming the seat of Cotton County. The names of Walter and Walters were used interchangeably and confusingly until June 1917, when an application was made to Congress to officially change the post office name to Walters.

Geography
The city is lies in the Taovayan Valley, the area between the Wichita Mountains and the Red River. Consisting of grassland, oak savannahs and rolling hills, the city lies within an ecotone on the western edge of the Cross Timbers, which are located to the east. Monsoon-like rains are common in the spring months, while periods of drought can occur throughout other parts of the year. The bottom lands around the creeks are thickly surrounded by Burr oak, Escarpment live oak, Shumard oak, Pecan, Eastern Redbud, American Persimmon, and American Elm.

For tourism purposes, the Oklahoma Tourism and Recreation Department has designated Southwestern Oklahoma, including Cotton County, as Great Plains Country.

Demographics

As of the census of 2000, there were 2,657 people, 1,063 households, and 721 families residing in the city. The population density was 326.6 people per square mile (126.2/km2). There were 1,256 housing units, for an average density of 154.4 per square mile (59.6/km2). The racial makeup of the city was 84.38% White, 0.38% African American, 10.24% Native American, 0.08% Asian, 1.02% from other races, and 3.91% from two or more races. Hispanic or Latino of any race were 3.42% of the population.

There were 1,063 households, out of which 33.6% had children under the age of 18 living with them, 54.1% were married couples living together, 10.4% had a female householder with no husband present, and 32.1% were non-families. 30.1% of all households were made up of individuals, and 18.3% had someone living alone who was 65 years of age or older. The average household size was 2.45 and the average family size was 3.05.

In age the city's the population was spread out, with 27.8% under the age of 18, 7.4% from 18 to 24, 26.7% from 25 to 44, 19.9% from 45 to 64, and 18.3% who were 65 years of age or older. The median age was 37 years. For every 100 females, there were 87.0 males. For every 100 females age 18 and over, there were 84.5 males.

The median income for a household in the city was $25,771 and the median income for a family was $31,532. Males had a median income of $27,578 versus $18,669 for females. The per capita income for the city was $14,398. About 15.9% of families and 19.6% of the population were below the poverty line, including 25.4% of those under age 18 and 17.9% of those age 65 or over.

Historic Buildings

All NRHP-listed buildings in Cotton County, Oklahoma are located in Walters:
The First United Methodist Church, built in 1917.
The Cotton County Courthouse, a Classical Revival structure from 1925.
The Walters Rock Island Depot.  In 1984 the city bought the Rock Island Depot, and the Cotton County Art Council rehabilitated the building, turning it into a museum.

Culture 
Media: The Walters Herald promotes itself as "The Voice of Cotton County."

Walters has many annual festivals that take place throughout the year. Festivals are centered around the arts, agriculture, western Cowboy culture, and Native American culture.

Spring 
The CCAC Arts & Crafts Festival is a judged arts and crafts festival sponsored by the Cotton County Art Council and the Oklahoma Arts Council.

Summer
Comanche Nation Homecoming Powwow, which features multiple categories of traditional American Indian dancing including gourd, cloth, buckskin, straight, fancy and more.  Food and merchandise vendors are also on-hand.

Round Up Club Rodeo, which besides the actual multi-day rodeo features a parade with decorated cars, trucks, tractors and floats.

Notable people
Fred R. Harris (b. 1930), former U.S Senator from Oklahoma and U.S presidential candidate 
LaDonna Harris (b. 1931), Comanche Native American social activist and politician
Van Heflin (1910-1971), Hollywood movie actor
Jed Johnson, Sr. (1888-1963), politician and editor. Practiced law in Walters.
Abe Lemons (1922-2002), College Basketball Coach and graduate of Walters High School.
James C. Nance, Oklahoma community newspaper chain publisher and former Speaker of the Oklahoma House of Representatives, President pro tempore of the Oklahoma Senate and member Uniform Law Commission

Utilities
Telephone, Internet, and Digital TV is provided by Hilliary Communications.

References

External links
 History of Cotton County

Cities in Cotton County, Oklahoma
Cities in Oklahoma
County seats in Oklahoma